Aerovias Latino Americanas, S.A. (Spanish for Latin American Airways), also known as ALA and ALASA, was a Salvadoran airline which operated in 1947.

On 30 April 1947, an ALASA Douglas C-47-DL, registered YS-30, was too low and collided with a train while attempting to land at the Ilopango International Airport in San Salvador. None of the four occupants of the aircraft were killed, but the aircraft was damaged beyond repair by the impact and fire.

See also 

List of defunct airlines of El Salvador

References 

1947 establishments in El Salvador
1940s disestablishments in El Salvador
Defunct airlines of El Salvador
Airlines established in 1947
Airlines disestablished in 1947